Clear Water Bay Country Park is a rural country park located in the New Territories of eastern Hong Kong. The park is located near the beaches in Clear Water Bay. The 6.15 square kilometre park opened on 28 September 1979 with features like:

 High Junk Peak
Miu Tsai Tun
 Tin Hau Temple in Fat Tong Mun, Joss House Bay
 Clear Water Bay Beach
 Clear Water Bay Tree Walk
 Clear Water Bay Golf Course
 Lung Ha Wan Country Trail

There is a designated hiking trail which begins on Clear Water Bay Road near Tseung Kwan O and ends near the Clearwater Bay golf course.

References
 Clear Water Bay Country Park
Clear Water Bay Walk

Country parks and special areas of Hong Kong
Clear Water Bay Peninsula
Clear Water Bay
1979 establishments in Hong Kong